The ANZ Centre is an office skyscraper in Auckland, New Zealand.
It was formerly known as the Coopers & Lybrand Tower and before that the Robert Jones Tower and it was the tallest building in New Zealand during the years 1991–1999, until it was surpassed by the 
Metropolis building. Today, it stands as the fifth tallest building in Auckland.

Construction
The building was designed by architects, Hassell Pty Limited, and construction of the tower began in 1989, and was subsequently completed in 1991. The tower stood tall and alone on the Auckland skyline until it was shadowed by the construction of the Sky Tower which began in 1995 and was completed in 1997.

See also
Benjamin Developments Ltd v Robt Jones (Pacific) Ltd
Forsyth Barr Building
List of tallest buildings in Auckland

References

Australia and New Zealand Banking Group
PricewaterhouseCoopers
1990s architecture in New Zealand
Office buildings completed in 1991
Skyscrapers in Auckland
Auckland CBD